The 1918 Primera División was the seventh season of top-flight Peruvian football. A total of 14 teams competed in the league, The champion was Sport Alianza.

League table

Standings

Title

External links
Peruvian Championship 
Peruvian Football League News 
La Liga Peruana de Football 

Peru
1918
1918 in Peruvian football